Gallipoli is a seven-part Australian television drama miniseries that was telecast on the Nine Network from 9 February 2015, the 100th anniversary of the Gallipoli Campaign. It is adapted from the best-selling book Gallipoli by Les Carlyon, and produced by Endemol Australia.

Premise
The seven-part series centres on 17-year-old Thomas "Tolly" Johnson (Kodi Smit-McPhee), who lies about his age so he may enlist with his brother Bevan (Harry Greenwood) and ends up fighting at Gallipoli in the campaign that helped create the ANZAC legend.

The story depicts the ten-month campaign in Turkey, highlighting the landing on 25 April 1915 by ANZAC troops who go into battle on the Gallipoli Peninsula. Landing in the dark, Tolly, Bevan, and their fellow soldiers of Australia's 4th Battalion endeavor to establish a defensible foothold beneath the treacherous slopes of the peninsula. The series follows both the battle and its aftermath.

The soldiers spend eight months learning combat skills while trying to survive in the most difficult of circumstances. By the time of their final evacuation they have learnt much about themselves and their mates.

Cast

 Kodi Smit-McPhee as Thomas "Tolly" Johnson
 Harry Greenwood as Bevan Johnson
 Sam Parsonson as Dave Klein
 Tom Budge as Cliff Sutton
 James Callis as Ellis Ashmead-Bartlett
 John Bach as General Sir Ian Hamilton
 Nicholas Hope as General Sir Walter Braithwaite
Paul English as Colonel Cecil Faber Aspinall-Oglander
 Anthony Hayes as Anthony Chandler
 Matt Nable as Sergeant Harry Perceval
 Leon Ford as Charles Bean
 Ashleigh Cummings as Celia Houghton
Justine Clarke as Noah Johnson
 Lincoln Lewis as Chook
 James Stewart as Billy Sing
Dion Williams as 'Two-Bob'
 Gracie Gilbert as Tessa

Andy McPhee as Major General John Antill
 Alex Tsitsopoulos as Mehmet Ozkan
Anthony Phelan as General Sir William Birdwood
David Whiteley as General Sir Cyril Brudenell White
John Fillingham as General Sir Alexander Godley
Travis Jeffery as Henry "Stewie" Stewart Watson
 Grant Bowler as Lieutenant Colonel William Malone
 Lachy Hulme as Lord Kitchener
 Jeremy Lindsay Taylor as Captain Eric Taylor
Yalin Ozucelik as Mustafa Kemal Atatürk
 Damon Gameau as Keith Murdoch
 Nicholas Hammond as Henry Nevinson
Brendon Nolan as Darryl 'Doon' Lincoln

Episodes

Production
The series is adapted from the best-selling book Gallipoli by Les Carlyon.

Gallipoli was produced by Endemol Australia and was shot over a three-month period commencing on 17 March 2014. Cast members undertook some military training in Melbourne before filming began. Filming took place in Melbourne and surrounding areas, including Bacchus Marsh and Werribee. The 25 April 1915 landing was recreated on the Mornington Peninsula.

John Edwards and Robert Connolly were the producers; the Nine Network's co-heads of drama, Jo Rooney and Andy Ryan, along with Endemol Australia CEO Janeen Faithfull were the executive producers. The series was directed by Glendyn Ivin, and the scriptwriter was Christopher Lee. The production employed around 750 local people and was expected to generate an estimated $14.6 million in production expenditure, with Film Victoria providing significant financing for the project through its Production Incentive Attraction Fund (PIAF).

Gallipoli is distributed internationally by Endemol Worldwide Distribution.

Release
The series premiered on 9 February 2015 on the Nine Network, and concluded four weeks later. All seven episodes of Gallipoli were made available on the streaming service Stan during the television premiere, as part of a promotion deal.

Reception

The series was a ratings disaster, described by David Gyngell, head of Nine Entertainment at the time, as the network's "biggest disappointment". Despite being launched as a flagship program for the network in 2015, Gallipoli lost half of its audience between the first and second episodes, down from 1.1 million to 580,000. In response, the network reduced the series' schedule from seven weeks' broadcast to five weeks, with episodes 4 & 5 and 6 & 7 airing back-to-back. Ratings continued to fall.

See also
 Deadline Gallipoli

References

External links
Endemol Australia-Gallipoli project
 

Nine Network original programming
Australian drama television series
2010s Australian television miniseries
World War I television drama series
Television series based on actual events
Television series set in the 1910s
English-language television shows
2015 Australian television series debuts
2015 Australian television series endings
Television series by Endemol
ANZAC (Australia)
Films about the Gallipoli campaign